Portrait of an Ecclesiastic is an oil on canvas painting by Moretto da Brescia, executed c. 1545, now in the Alte Pinakothek in Munich, Germany. It was acquired in 1838 in Venice by marquess Canova.

References

Paintings by Moretto da Brescia
1545 paintings
16th-century portraits
Portraits of men
Collection of the Alte Pinakothek
Books in art